The Juniata Valley School District, commonly abbreviated JVSD, is a rural public school district based in the borough of Alexandria, Pennsylvania.  The school district includes all of Alexandria borough, Petersburg borough, Barree Township, Logan Township, West Township, Morris Township and Spruce Creek township.
The district encompasses approximately 125 square miles. According to 2000 federal census data, it serves a resident population of 5,334.

Schools
The Juniata Valley School District operates one junior/high school, one elementary school. The school also sends students to the regional career & technology center, used by other three school districts in Huntingdon County. The district office is located on 7775 Juniata Valley Pike, Alexandria, PA 16611.

 Juniata Valley Junior-Senior High School - Alexandria - Grades 7-12
7775 Juniata Valley Pike, Alexandria, PA 16611
 Juniata Valley Elementary School - Alexandria - Grades K-6
7855 Juniata Valley Pike, Alexandria, PA 16611

Extracurriculars
The district offers a variety of clubs, activities and sports.

Athletics
 Baseball - Class A
 Basketball - Class A
 Cross Country - Class AA
 Football - Class A
 Softball - Class A
 Track and Field - Class AA
 Volleyball - Class A
 Wrestling - Class AA

State Championships
1996 Class A Basketball State Champs   PIAA Basketball State Champs

References

External links
 Juniata Valley School District
 PIAA

School districts in Huntingdon County, Pennsylvania